Iche or ICHE may refer to:

René Iché (1897–1954), a French sculptor
Roland Iche (born 1947), a French canoeist
Infection Control and Hospital Epidemiology (ICHE), a medical journal
International Council for Higher Education (ICHE), an international educational organization
, a village in Figuig Province, Morocco